Stark Point is a rocky point on the east side of Croft Bay, northern James Ross Island. It is formed by almost vertical cliffs which rise from the sea to 285 meters. Surveyed by Falkland Islands Dependencies Survey (FIDS) in August 1953. The descriptive name was applied by United Kingdom Antarctic Place-Names Committee (UK-APC).

Headlands of James Ross Island